David Graf (born 12 January 1989) is a German boxer. He competed in the men's heavyweight event at the 2016 Summer Olympics where he lost in the round of 16 to Yamil Peralta. He was formerly known as Vahagn Sahakyan.

References

External links
 
 
 
 

1989 births
Living people
German male boxers
Olympic boxers of Germany
Boxers at the 2016 Summer Olympics
Sportspeople from Yerevan
Armenian emigrants to Germany
Heavyweight boxers